Christopher M. Jermaine is an American computer scientist who is the J.S. Abercrombie Professor of Engineering and chair of the Department of Computer Science at Rice University.

Education 
Jermaine earned a Bachelor of Arts degree in mathematics from the University of California, San Diego, a Master of Science in computer science from Ohio State University, and a PhD in computer science from Georgia Tech. Jermaine's graduate advisor was Renée Miller.

Career 
From 2002 to 2010, Jermaine was on the computer science faculty of the University of Florida. He joined Rice University in 2009. Jermaine is also the editor-in-chief of ACM Transactions on Database Systems. His research focuses on data analytics, data management, and database theory.

References 

Living people
American computer scientists
University of California, San Diego alumni
Ohio State University alumni
Georgia Tech alumni
University of Florida faculty
Rice University faculty
Year of birth missing (living people)